Scythris empetrella is a moth of the family Scythrididae described by Ole Karsholt and Ebbe Nielsen in 1976 and found in Europe.

Description
The wingspan is 8–10 mm. Adults are on wing from June to July.

Distribution
S. empetrella is found in Great Britain, Spain, France, Belgium, the Netherlands, Germany, Denmark, Norway, Sweden, Finland, Estonia and Lithuania. The habitat is sandy heathland.

References

External links
 Plant Parasites of Europe

empetrella
Moths described in 1976
Moths of Europe
Taxa named by Ebbe Nielsen